Nyctibatrachus deccanensis (common names: Deccan night frog, Deccan wrinkled frog) is a species of frogs in the family Nyctibatrachidae. It is endemic to the southern Western Ghats in Tamil Nadu and Kerala states, India. Its natural habitats are tropical moist lowland forests, moist montane forests, and rivers. It is threatened by habitat loss.

References

External links

Nyctibatrachus
Frogs of India
Endemic fauna of the Western Ghats
Amphibians described in 1984
Taxonomy articles created by Polbot